is a peak of the Tanzawa Mountains with an elevation of , and is located due east of Mount Tō. It is located within the boundary of the Tanzawa-Ōyama Quasi-National Park.

The mountain is easily accessible by a hiking trail from Yabitsu Pass, which intersects with the Nagaone Trail from the village of Kiyokawa, and with the trail leading directly to Mount Tō which is approximately a 40-minute hike.

Gallery

Shindainichi